Langley Castle is a restored medieval tower house, now operated as a hotel, situated in the village of Langley in the valley of the River South Tyne some  south of Haydon Bridge, Northumberland, England. It is a Grade I listed building.

Details

It was built in the middle of the 14th century by Sir Thomas de Lucy as a great H plan H-shaped tower of four storeys. Before this the site was the seat of the Barons of Tynedale in the 12th century, from whom descend the Tyndall family. It was attacked and severely damaged in 1405 by the forces of Henry IV in the campaign against the Percys and Archbishop Scrope. It remained as a ruin until it was bought and restored by a local historian, Cadwallader Bates, in 1882. Bates died in 1902 and his wife Josephine continued the restoration. After she died in 1932 the building remained empty until it was used as a barracks in the Second World War, following which it was used as a girls' school. In the 1980s, it was bought by the Robb family. In 1986, it was bought by Dr Stuart Madnick, a professor at the Massachusetts Institute of Technology, who converted it into a hotel. One of the more remarkable features of the building is the south-west tower, which is occupied by no fewer than 12 garderobes, four to each floor.

See also 
 Castles in Great Britain and Ireland
 List of castles in England

Further reading

References

External links
Langley Castle Hotel
Langley Castle
  Images of Langley Castle
More details on early ownership

Castles in Northumberland
Grade I listed buildings in Northumberland
Grade I listed castles
Hotels in Northumberland